Gleeson is a ghost town situated in southeastern Cochise County, Arizona, United States. The town was first settled as Turquoise in the 1870s in what was then the Arizona Territory, then later re-established as Gleeson in 1900.

History
The area was initially settled as a mining camp called Turquoise after the mineral which had been mined by Native Americans in the area. The Turquoise post office was established on October 22, 1890, and lasted only a few years until September 17, 1894. When local miner John Gleeson registered a copper claim and opened the Copper Belle Mine, the town of Gleeson was created just downhill from the old site of Turquoise. Silver Bill, Pejon and Defiance were some of the other mines that followed in the surrounding areas.

The Gleeson post office, established on October 15, 1900, supported a town of about 500 people engaged primarily in copper mining, including veins of lead, silver and zinc.

In 1912, 28 buildings burned to the ground and the town was rebuilt.

Copper production boomed to supply demand during World War I. The mines played out by the 1930s and eventually the Gleeson post office closed on March 31, 1939.

Remnants
Though several families still live on the site, Gleeson is, by all measures, a ghost town, with the only commercial venture appearing to be a rattlesnake products store. Visitors can find the ruins of a hospital, a saloon, a cemetery, a jail, the foundation of the village school and evidence of the extensive mining in the surrounding hills near town. The Gleeson cemetery is west of the town on the road to Tombstone.

The Arizona Republic newspaper published an article on the town on January 12, 2014, stating that the jail has been renovated and now is a museum.

Geography

Gallery

See also
 Gleeson Gunfight

References

External links

 Gleeson, Arizona provides pictures, maps and historic information about Gleeson Ghost Town.
 Ghost Town of the Month entry for Gleeson: recent photos and visitor information.
 GleesonArizona.com Site dedicated to Gleeson information and history.
 Gleeson (Turquoise) – ghosttowns.com

Landmarks in Arizona
Former populated places in Cochise County, Arizona
Mining communities in Arizona
Populated places established in 1900
1900 establishments in Arizona Territory
Ghost towns in Arizona
Cemeteries in Arizona